The Gulangyu, Gulang Island or Kulangsu is a pedestrian-only island off the coast of Xiamen, Fujian Province in southeastern China. Although only about 20,000 people live on the island, Gulangyu is a major domestic tourist destination, attracting more than 10 million visitors per year, and making it one of China's most visited tourist attractions. Gulangyu not only bans cars, but also bicycles. The only vehicles permitted are small electric buggies and electric government service vehicles.

Visitors can reach Gulangyu by ferry from the ferry terminal in Xiamen. Local residents are allowed to use a shorter 5-minute ferry to/from the Lun Du Ferry Terminal. During the day (every 20 minutes, from 7:10 AM to 5:30 PM in Winter and Spring / from 7:10 AM to 6:30 PM in Summer and Autumn), tourists and non-locals take a 20-minute ferry ride from the Dongdu International Cruise Terminal to either San Qiu Tian Terminal or Nei Cuo Ao Terminal in Kulangsu Town. A ticket costs 35 CNY. After 6:00 PM, there is a more convenient ferry from Lundu Terminal 2, which drops off at San Qiu Tian Terminal in Kulangsu Town. That service runs all night, and also costs 35 CNY.

Gulangyu Island is renowned for its beaches, winding lanes and rich architecture. The island is on China's list of National Scenic Spots and is classified as a 5A tourist attraction by the China National Tourism Administration (CNTA). It ranks at the top of the list of the ten most scenic areas in the province.

Gulangyu covers an area of 1.91 square kilometres (0.74 sq mi), with a household population of 15,373. Administratively, the island constitutes the Gulangyu Subdistrict, part of Xiamen's Siming District.

History

The International Settlement

For a time, Gulangyu was the only international settlement on Chinese soil apart from the International Settlement at Shanghai.

Soon after Xiamen became a treaty port resulting from China's loss in the First Opium War and the Treaty of Nanking in 1842, foreign residents on the island established an informal organization that became formally organized several decades later when its Land Regulations were approved by the government of China (Qing dynasty) in May 1902. Eventually 13 countries, including Great Britain, France, The Netherlands and Japan, were to have extraterritorial privileges there and take part in the Kulangsu Municipal Council that administered the settlement. As with the Shanghai International Settlement, the British played a predominant role in the administration and Sikh policemen from British India were charged with the policing of the Settlement under the Kulangsu Municipal Police. The consulates, churches, hospitals, schools, police stations, etc. built by those foreign communities explain the predominantly Victorian-era style architecture that can still be seen throughout Gulangyu. Japanese occupation of the island began in 1942, and lasted until the end of World War II, when it was returned to China. The Hokkien dialect is spoken on the island, as it is in Xiamen.

People's Republic of China

After the establishment of the PRC, Gulangyu was a district of Xiamen, one of four in the municipality not located on Xiamen Island until 2003. In May of that year Gulangyu District was absorbed into Siming District, and has since been administered, policed, and adjudicated from Xiamen Island, just across the Lujiang River.

Attractions

As a place of residence for Westerners during Xiamen's colonial past, Gulangyu is famous for its architecture and for hosting China's only piano museum, giving it the nickname of "Piano Island" or "The Town of Pianos" or "The Island of Music". There are over 200 pianos on this island.

The Chinese name also has musical roots, as 鼓浪 Kó͘-lōng which means drum waves so-called because of the sound generated by the ocean waves hitting the reefs. 嶼 sū means "islet".

In addition, there is a museum dedicated to Koxinga, Hái-toé Sè-kài Marine World, a subtropical garden containing plants introduced by overseas Chinese, as well as Xiamen Museum, formerly the Eight Trigrams Tower.

The island of Gulangyu is a pedestrian-only destination, where the only vehicles on the islands are several fire trucks and electric tourist buggies. The narrow streets on the island, together with the architecture of various styles around the world, give the island a unique appearance. The site is classified as a AAAAA scenic area by the China National Tourism Administration.

Buildings and sights of the former international settlements includes:

 United States Consulate Building by architect Elliott Hazzard
 Kulangsu Catholic Church (Tian Zhu Tang) c. 1917
 Former Office of Great Northern Telegraph Company (Denmark) (Dan Mai Da Bei Dian Bao Gong Si) c. 1871
 Kulangsu Organ Museum (Eight Diagrams Mansion / Bagua Mansion) c. 1907 - designed by John Abraham Otte
 Foreigners' Football Field (Ren Min Ti Yu Chang) c. 1878
 Former Kulangsu Mixed Court (Hui Shen Gong Tang) c. 1915
 Union Church (Xie He Li Bai Tang) c. 1911
 Christian Cemetery (Fan Zai Mu Yuan)

Transportation
Gulangyu is unique in China as a "traffic-free island". It is connected to the main island of Xiamen by ferry. Neither cars nor bicycles are allowed, unlike Xiamen Island across the river. Recently, electric tourist buggies were introduced. Freight is pulled on wheeled wooden carts up the often steep lanes by strong teams of men.

Culture 
The spread of Christianity in 1900s brought western music to the island. Churches and museums were built, and people enjoyed going to music halls to hear performances. Since then, the island's local cultural environment mingled with introduced foreign music and art, which is why the Gulangyu cultural scene differs from other parts of China.

Classical music 
A number of China's most famous classical musicians come from Gulangyu, including the pianist Yin Chengzong, the violist Jing Yang, and the pianist Xu Feiping. Historically, Shu'an Zhou, Junji Lin, and Zuohuang Chen are other well-known classical musicians from the island. Gulangyu's piano ownership per capita ranks the first in nation, and by 2002, Gulangyu Island was given the name of "The Island of Music" by Chinese Musicians' Association. The piano exhibition halls and museums and overall artistic atmosphere attract many musicians domestically and internationally. The 580-seat Gulangyu Concert Hall is one of Fujian Province's most notable acoustic classical music venues. The classical violist Jing Yang is from Gulangyu, and also lives on the island.

Awards 
In 2005, Gulangyu Island was named the most beautiful district of China by Chinese National Geography magazine.

In May 2007, Xiamen Gulangyu Island was officially accredited as the National 5A Tourist Attractions by the National Tourism Administration of China.

On 8 July 2017, Gulangyu was listed as a UNESCO World Heritage Site.

See also

List of car-free places
List of World Heritage Sites in China
List of islands of China

References

Further reading

Gallery

External links

Kulangsu government visitor's site
Webpage about the island, with map
Shanghai Star article: "Gulangyu Island - Garden on the sea"
Shenzhen Daily article: "Gulangyu - A Piano Island"
Article on newcolonist.com: "China's Carfree Town: Gulangyu"
Xiamen-Kulangsu ferry guide
Dr Howard M Scott "Kulanghsu"
Gulangyu Boat Tour
Robin's World travel guide to Kulangsu
CNN.com "Kulangsu: Scaling China's Piano Island"

World Heritage Sites in China
Islands of Fujian
Islands of the South China Sea
Geography of Xiamen
Taiwan Strait
Car-free zones in Asia
Concessions in China
AAAAA-rated tourist attractions
Major National Historical and Cultural Sites in Fujian
Populated places in Fujian